The women's 4 × 100 metre medley relay competition at the 2006 Pan Pacific Swimming Championships took place on August 20 at the Saanich Commonwealth Place.  The last champion was Australia.

Records
Prior to this competition, the existing world and Pan Pacific records were as follows:

Results
All times are in minutes and seconds.

Heats
Heats weren't performed, as only seven teams had entered.

Final 
The final was held on August 20, at 20:27.

References

4 × 100 metre medley relay
2006 Pan Pacific Swimming Championships
2006 in women's swimming